In the mathematical discipline of graph theory the Tutte–Berge formula is a characterization of the size of a maximum matching in a graph.  It is a generalization of Tutte theorem on perfect matchings, and is named after W. T. Tutte (who proved Tutte's theorem) and Claude Berge (who proved its generalization).

Statement
The theorem states that the size of a maximum matching of a graph  equals

where  counts how many of the connected components of the graph  have an odd number of vertices.

Equivalently, the number of unmatched vertices in a maximum matching equals.

Explanation
Therefore, if some choice of  has few vertices but its removal creates a large number of odd components, then there will be many unmatched vertices, implying that the matching itself will be small. This reasoning can be made precise by stating that the size of a maximum matching is at most equal to the value given by the Tutte–Berge formula.

The characterization of Tutte and Berge proves that this is the only obstacle to creating a large matching: the size of the optimal matching will be determined by the subset  with the biggest difference between its numbers of odd components outside  and vertices inside . That is, there always exists a subset  such that deleting  creates the correct number of odd components  needed to make the formula true. There can be no other odd components, because all other vertices remain matched after deleting .

Relation to Tutte's theorem
Tutte's theorem characterizes the graphs with perfect matchings as being the ones for which deleting any subset  of vertices creates at most  odd components. (A subset  that creates at least  odd components can always be found in the empty set.) Thus, Tutte's theorem can be derived as a corollary of the Tutte–Berge formula, and the formula can be seen as a generalization of Tutte's theorem.

See also 
 Graph toughness, a problem of creating many connected components by removing a small set of vertices without regard to the parity of the components
 Hall's marriage theorem

References

 Reprinted by Dover Publications, 2001.

 

Matching (graph theory)
Theorems in discrete mathematics